Dawn Silva is an American funk vocalist.

Silva started her career as a background vocalist for Sly and the Family Stone. She joined Parliament-Funkadelic in 1977. She was the only original Brides of Funkenstein member to continue through the Brides' entire career. In 1978, with Lynn Mabry, she released the successful Funk Or Walk.  The Bride's first single release on Atlantic Records, "Disco To Go", sold over five hundred thousand units, and was certified Gold.  In 1979, with Sheila Horne and Jeanette McGruder, she released the top single "Never Buy Texas From A Cowboy," voted by Rolling Stone in 2001 as one of the top 50 coolest albums ever released. The Brides were the only group in the P-Funk organization to receive a Rhythm and Blues Award in 1981 for Never Buy Texas From A Cowboy.

Later career 
Silva recorded and toured with The Gap Band in 1982. She signed a solo deal with Polygram Records in 1988, but her debut album was never released.

Her recording and touring credits include but are not limited to; Ice Cube, Boyz n the Hood, Roy Ayers, Snoop Dogg, Coolio, B.B. King, and Parliament Funkadelic. Her first solo album release in Europe on Musisoft (Paris France) All My Funky Friends, December 2000, sold thousands of units, and was hailed by Tower Records (2001) as the only authentic funk album to be released in over two decades.

Discography 
High On You Sly & The Family Stone (Epic/CBS)1975
Heard Ya Missed Me,Well I'm Back Sly & The Family Stone (Epic/CBS)1976
Parliament Live P.Funk Earth Tour Parliament (Casablanca)1977
Funkentelechy vs. the Placebo Syndrom Parliament  (Casablanca)1977
Game, Dames and Guitar Thangs Eddie Hazel (Warner Bros) 1977
One Nation Under a Groove Funkadelic (Warner Bros) 1978
Motor-Booty Affair Parliament (Casablanca)1978
GloryHallaStopoid Parliament(Casablanca)1979
Trombibulation Parliament(Casablanca)1980
Games Dames & Guitar Thangs Eddie Hazel (Warner Bros) 1977
 Fred Wesley and The Horny Horns (Atlantic)
Funk or Walk The Brides Of Funkenstein (Atlantic)1978
Never Buy Texas From a Cowboy The Brides of Funkenstein (Atlantic)1979
This Boot is Made For Fonk-N Bootsy Collins (Warner Bros) 1979
Gap Band IV The Gap Band (Total Experience) 1982
Gap Band V The Gap Band (Total Experience) 1983
Gap Band VI The Gap Band (Total Experience) 1984
Gap Band VII The Gap Band (Total Experience) 1985
All My Funky Friends Dawn Silva (SilvaSounds/JDC Records) 2000

References

External links 
.

1954 births
Living people
Musicians from Sacramento, California
African-American women singers
American funk singers
American women singers
P-Funk members